William F. Berndt is a former member of the Wisconsin State Assembly and Wisconsin State Senate.

Biography
Berndt was born on July 18, 1956. He graduated from River Falls High School in River Falls, Wisconsin, class of 1974, before attending the University of Wisconsin–River Falls and the University of Minnesota. Berndt is married with a son and daughter. He owned a furniture manufacturing company.

Career
Berndt served as a Republican in the Assembly, he was first elected in 1984 and was re-elected in 1986. He was elected to the Senate in a special election in 1989 and served until 1993.

References

External links
The Political Graveyard

People from River Falls, Wisconsin
Republican Party Wisconsin state senators
Republican Party members of the Wisconsin State Assembly
University of Wisconsin–River Falls alumni
University of Minnesota alumni
Businesspeople from Wisconsin
1956 births
Living people